The Malaysian University English Test (commonly abbreviated as MUET) is a test of English language proficiency, largely used for university admissions in Malaysia. The test is set and run by the Malaysian Examinations Council. MUET is largely recognised in Malaysia and Singapore, with limited recognition in other countries worldwide.

MUET is a prerequisite for admissions into all public universities and colleges in Malaysia. Besides that, public servants also take MUET as an English qualification and for promotion opportunities.

From 2012 onwards, MUET is administered three times a year, in March, July and November. Besides that, an alternative test, MUET on Demand, is also held in nearly every month for candidates who are urgent to get the MUET results. On average, 85,000 candidates sit for the MUET each time.

From 2021, MUET has undergone a major change in format.

Components, Scoring and Grading 
There are four components in MUET:
Listening (800/1)
Speaking (800/2)
Reading (800/3)
Writing (800/4)

Starting from MUET 2021, the maximum scores for each component are 90, makes an aggregated score of 360. The scores are graded in nine bands, including half bands, with Band 5+ being the highest while Band 1.0 the lowest.

Prior to MUET 2020, the maximum scores for each component is 45 for Listening and Speaking, 120 for Reading Comprehension and 90 for Writing, with an aggregated score of 300. The scores are then graded in six bands, with Band 6 being the highest while Band 1 the lowest.

Locations and test dates 
The MUET test centres are largely in public secondary schools that offer Form Six, matriculation colleges, certain universities, as well as certain private and semi-private colleges.

Listening, Reading and Writing components are usually tested on the same day, normally the second or the fourth Saturday of the month. The Speaking component is held on separate days, usually before the written tests.

See also 
 Sijil Tinggi Persekolahan Malaysia
 IELTS (International English Language Testing System)
 TOEFL (Test of English as a Foreign Language)
 SAT (Scholastic Assessment Test)

External links 
 Malaysian Examinations Council

References

Examinations
2012 introductions
Standardized tests for English language
English-language education